Manhattan Moon is an American romantic comedy directed by Stuart Walker, and stars Ricardo Cortez and Dorothy Page.  It was released on August 5, 1935.

Plot

Cast

 Ricardo Cortez as Dan Moore
 Dorothy Page as Yvonne/Doris
 Henry Mollison as Reggie Van Dorset
 Hugh O'Connell as Speed
 Regis Toomey as Eddie
 Adrienne D'Ambricourt as Maid
 Luis Alberni as Luigi)
 Henry Armetta as Tony
 William L'Estrange Millman as Wilbur, secretary
 Irving Bacon as Hot dog man
 Jack Cheatham as Henchman
 Colonel Robinson as Mr. Van Dorset
 Elizabeth Williams as Mrs. Van Dorset
 Rudolph Cornell as Usher
 Jean Perry as Head waiter
 Joe Connors as Dancer
 Evelyn Miller as Tessie
 Lou Seymour as Master of ceremonies
 Earl Eby as Guest
 Marcia Remy as Guest
 John Hall as Theatre doorman
 Lloyd Whitlock as Apartment house manager
 Hal Price as Station announcer
 Corbet Morris as Parker
 Stanley Mack as News photographer
 Jack Gardner as News photographer
 Monte Montague as Policeman
 Jerry Mandy as Vendor
 Harry Mancke as Stage manager
 Paddy O'Flynn as Reporter
 Walter Clinton as Reporter
 Harry Harvey as Reporter
 Don Brodie as Reporter
 Clayton Romler as Dancing partner
 Florence Enright as Dialogue coach

References

External links
 
 
 

1935 films
1935 romantic comedy films
Films directed by Stuart Walker
American black-and-white films
American romantic comedy films
Films scored by Karl Hajos
1930s English-language films
1930s American films